The Special Organization (Teşkilât-ı Mahsusa,  or ) was a paramilitary organization in the Ottoman Empire known for its key role in the commission of the Armenian genocide. Originally organized under the Ministry of War, the organization was shifted to answer directly to the ruling party Committee of Union and Progress (CUP) in February 1915. Led by Bahaeddin Şakir and Doctor Nazım and formed in early 1914 of tribesmen (especially Circassians and Kurds) as well as more than 10,000 convicted criminals—offered a chance to redeem themselves if they served the state—as a force independent of the regular army that could be used to attack civilians. It was the progenitor of the National Security Service of the Republic of Turkey, which was itself the predecessor of the modern National Intelligence Organization.

Origins 
The exact date of establishment is unclear or disputed. According to some researchers, the organization might have been established by Enver Pasha, who placed Süleyman Askeri in charge of the organization on 17 November 1913. Its establishment date is rather vague since it was really a continuation of various smaller groups established by Enver Pasa and friends in the aftermath of 1908 Young Turk Revolution.

Activities (1913–1918)

Armenian genocide
Enver Pasha assumed the primary role in the direction of the Special Organization and its center of administration moved to Erzurum. The first leader of the Special Organization was Süleyman Askeri Bey. After his death, he was replaced by Ali Bach Hamba on 14 April 1915, who held the post until the Armistice of Mudros. The last director, Hüsamettin Ertürk, worked as an agent in Istanbul of the Ankara government following the Armistice. He wrote a memoir called İki Devrin Perde Arkası (Behind the Scenes of Two Eras).

Many members of this organization who played particular roles in the Armenian genocide also participated in the Turkish national movement. The Special Organisation, which was made of especially fanatical Unionist cadres, was expanded from August 1914 onwards. Talaat Pasha, as the Interior Minister, gave orders that all of the prisoners convicted of the worst crimes, such as murder, rape and robbery, could have their freedom if they agreed to join the Special Organisation to kill Armenians and loot their property.  Besides the hardened career criminals who joined in large numbers to have their freedom, the rank and file of Special Organisation killing units included Kurdish tribesmen attracted by the prospect of plunder and refugees from Rumelia, who were thirsting for the prospect of revenge against Christians after having been forced to flee from the Balkans in 1912. The recruitment of thuggish career criminals straight from the prison system into the Special Organisation explains the very high incidence of rape during the Armenian genocide.

As explained in the key indictment at the trial (in absentia) of the Three Pashas, the Armenian genocide massacres were spearheaded by the Special Organisation under one of its leaders, the Turkish physician Dr. Behaeddin Shakir. The Special Organisation was much feared by all and were by all accounts the ones responsible for the worst violence against the Armenians. The American historian Gerard Libaridian wrote about the lethal combination in the Special Organisation of fanatical Unionist cadres commanding convicts newly released from prison:

To prevent ordinary Muslims, whatever they be Turks, Kurds or Arabs, from saving the lives of the Armenians, a decree declaring the penalty for sheltering Armenians was death by hanging and the destruction of one's home was passed; despite this decree, a number of ordinary Turks, Kurds and Arabs did shelter Armenians from the fury of the Special Organisation. Other ordinary Turks, Kurds and Arabs did assist the army, the gendarmes and the Special Organisation in the deportations and killings, motivated by the desire to loot Armenian property, to have Armenian women and girls as sex slaves or because of incitements by Muslim clergymen saying that the genocide was an act of jihad. As the gendarmes rounded up the Armenians for deportation, it was common for slave markets to be established where for the right price a Muslim man could buy Armenian women and/or girls to use as his sex slaves.  Besides genocide against the Armenians, the CUP regime waged the Assyrian genocide against the Assyrian minority and the Pontic Greek genocide against the Pontic Greeks in Pontus. In Thrace and western Anatolia the Special Organization assisted by government and army officials, deported all Greek men of military age to labor brigades beginning in summer 1914 and lasting through 1916.

Other activities
During World War I Eşref Sencer Kuşçubası was allegedly the director of operations in Arabia, the Sinai, and North Africa. He was captured in Yemen in early 1917 by the British military and was a POW in Malta until 1920 and subsequently released in exchange for British POWs. However, Ahmet Efe has written that the Ottoman military archives have detailed information on the organization's personnel, and that Kuşçubası is not mentioned.

In Libya, Nuri Killigil organized operations involving propaganda, subversion, terrorism and sabotage; he coordinated these operations with the Senussi.

Members 
This list includes allegedly notable members, according to an interview with its purported former leader Eşref Kuşçubaşı by U.S. INR officer Philip H. Stoddard: Although the bulk of its 30,000 members were drawn from trained specialists such as doctors, engineers, and journalists, the organization also employed criminals denoted başıbozuk, who had been released from prison in 1913 by amnesty.

Disbanding 
The organization was dismantled following a parliamentary debate and replaced by the Worldwide Islamic Revolt after World War I. This organization held its first meeting in Berlin. However, it was forced underground by the British, who refused to let these German allies operate.

In 1921, Atatürk founded another secret organization called the National Defense Society, headed by the former chief of the Special Organization, Hüsamettin Ertürk.

References

Bibliography 
 
 

 
  (unpublished MA thesis)
 
  (unpublished PhD dissertation; available in Turkish)

Further reading
Documents about the Special Organization in the Krikor Guerguerian archive

Armenian genocide
Greek genocide
Defunct intelligence agencies
Defunct organizations based in Turkey
Paramilitary organizations based in Asia
Secret police
 
Turkish intelligence agencies
World War I crimes by the Ottoman Empire